The Montcalm Massif is a mountain massif located in the Pyrenees, at the border between France and Spain, it has an altitude of 3077 metres above sea level.

Some of the summits are over 3,000 m high and the highest mountain in Catalonia (Pica d'Estats), as well as the highest mountain in Ariège (Pic de Montcalm), are part of this massif.

Protected areas
The Parc naturel régional des Pyrénées ariégeoises is located on the French side of the massif area and the Parc Natural de l'Alt Pirineu on the Spanish side.

Climbing some of the summits is not easy and there have been occasional accidents involving overconfident mountaineers.

The Estany de Canalbona or Estanyol Occidental de Canalbona is a pristine glacial lake located in the Montcalm Massif between the Pic de Canalbona and the Rodó de Canalbona, at the base of the "Collet Fals" near the "Pica d'Estats". The lake drains towards the Catalan side. The lake stays frozen most of the year, but the ice is usually totally melted at the end of the summer.

Summits
Some of the main summits are:
 Pica d'Estats, 3143 m
 Pic de Montcalm, 3077 m
 Pic de Sotllo or Pic du port de Sullo, 3072 m
 Pic Verdaguer, 3131 m
 Punta Gabarro, 3115 m
 Rodo de Canalbona, 3004 m
 Pic de Canalbona, 2965 m

See also
Pyrenees
List of Pyrenean three-thousanders
Mountains of Catalonia

References

External links

Pictures of the Massif

Mountains of Catalonia
Mountains of the Pyrenees